Pauline Little (born c. 1958) is a Scottish-born Canadian voice, film, and television  actress who currently resides in Montreal, Quebec.

She voices the twins Lotus and Jasmine in The Little Flying Bears, Maya in Maya the Bee, Francine in Samurai Pizza Cats and Caillou's Grandma in Caillou.

She can also be seen in The Day After Tomorrow and Last Exit. Her stage roles included the 1993 production of Peter Cureton's Passages.

Bio 
Born in Scotland to theatrical parents, Little was raised in Montreal. Pauline graduated with a BFA in Theatre Performance from Concordia University in 1982 and began acting soon after. She started in theatre and then moved on to movies and television, but later moved on to doing voice acting work for animation.

She is married to actor and fellow Canadian Mark Camacho. Their son, Jesse Camacho, is also an actor, best known for the television series Less Than Kind.

Filmography

Films

Television

Animation

Video games

References

External links
 

Living people
Canadian television actresses
Canadian film actresses
Actresses from Montreal
Anglophone Quebec people
Canadian voice actresses
Canadian stage actresses
Scottish voice actresses
Scottish stage actresses
Scottish television actresses
Scottish film actresses
Year of birth missing (living people)
Canadian people of Scottish descent